Maneh-ye Pain (also Romanized as Maneh-ye Pā’īn; also known as Manneh-ye Pāeen) is a village in Zarabad-e Gharbi Rural District, Zarabad District, Konarak County, Sistan and Baluchestan Province, Iran. At the 2006 census, its population was 126, in 25 families.

References 

Populated places in Konarak County